Elvin Beqiri (born 27 September 1980) is a former Albanian footballer, who spent the mayority of his career playing Vllaznia Shkodër. Beqiri was also an international footballer, having 47 caps for the Albania national team. His former teams included Metalurh Donetsk, Alania Vladikavkaz, Maccabi Tel Aviv and Khazar Lankaran.

Club career
Beqiri returned to his first club Vllaznia Shkodër on 12 July 2012 by penning a two-year contract. During his presentation, Beqiri stated that he will end his professional career at Vllaznia. He decided to retire from football after the end of 2014–15 season, ending his sixteen-year career.

International career
He made his debut for Albania in a January 2002 friendly match against Macedonia in Bahrain and earned a total of 47 caps, scoring no goals. His final international was an October 2009 FIFA World Cup qualification match against Sweden in Solna.

Career statistics

Club

International

References

External links

Player details 
Profile on Khazar Lankaran FC website
 

1980 births
Living people
Footballers from Shkodër
Albanian footballers
Albanian football managers
Association football defenders
Albania international footballers
KF Vllaznia Shkodër players
Albanian expatriate footballers
FC Metalurh Donetsk players
Expatriate footballers in Ukraine
Albanian expatriate sportspeople in Ukraine
Ukrainian Premier League players
FC Spartak Vladikavkaz players
Expatriate footballers in Russia
Albanian expatriate sportspeople in Russia
Russian Premier League players
Israeli Premier League players
Maccabi Tel Aviv F.C. players
Expatriate footballers in Israel
Albanian expatriate sportspeople in Israel
FC Arsenal Kyiv players
Khazar Lankaran FK players
Expatriate footballers in Azerbaijan
Albanian expatriate sportspeople in Azerbaijan